Tashmoo may refer to:

 Tashmoo Park, an amusement park in Algonac, Michigan that existed from 1897 to 1951
 , an 1899 American steamboat